Feqiyê Teyran (born Mir Mehemed, 1590–1660) was a Kurdish poet who wrote in Kurmanji. He is best known for his work Zembîlfiroş, and is also credited for writing the first literary account of the Battle of Dimdim which took place in 1609 and 1610. He is considered a pioneer in Kurdish Sufi literature and one of the founders of the Kurdish literary tradition with Ali Hariri, Melayê Cizîrî, Mela Huseynê Bateyî and Ahmad Khani.

Biography 
The first written information about Teyran stems from Mahmud Bayazidi in the mid-19th century. He was born in the village of Verezuz/Verezor, in Miks, Hakkâri of the Ottoman Empire and graduated from a madrasa. During his studies, he travelled to Hizan, Finik, Heşete and also to Cizre of Bohtan where he could have studied under Melayê Cizîrî. Instead of becoming a mullah, he continued to work on poetry as a profession and would wander around like a dervish and read his poems to the assemblies and madrasas he visited. His father was named Abdullah and Teyran plausibly came from a family of beys since he used the title mir. He died in Miks, but his tombstone was only found in 2013 in the village of Şandis in Hizan.

Style and legacy 
Poems of Teyran which have been described as 'colorful' have subsequently been used in Kurdish folk music. He wrote in plain language, used folklore elements and drew attention to mysticism. Subjects included divine love, knowledge, wisdom, female beauty, nature and the waḥdat al-wujūd. His poems were written in prosody and he preferred quatrains over couplets.

Works 

Hikâyetâ Şeyh-i San’ân (1621)
 Kısseyâ Bersîs
 Kavlê Hespê Reş
 Dilo Rabê (1631)
Cezerî (1640, written to Melayê Cizîrî)
 Zembîlfiroş
Bersîsê Âbid
Beyta Dimdim

References

Further reading

 

Teyran, Feqiyê
People from Hakkâri
Teyran, Feqiyê
Teyran, Feqiyê
Kurdish Sufis
People from Van Province
17th-century Kurdish people